John Alfred Williams (December 5, 1925 – July 3, 2015) was an African American author, journalist, and academic. His novel The Man Who Cried I Am was a bestseller in 1967. Also a poet, he won an American Book Award for his 1998 collection Safari West.

Life and career
Williams was born in Jackson, Mississippi, and his family moved to Syracuse, New York. After naval service in World War II, he graduated in 1950 from Syracuse University.  He was a journalist for Ebony (his September 1963 Ebony article "Negro In Literature Today" has been singled out for particular praise), Jet, and Newsweek magazines.

His novels, which include The Angry Ones (1960) and The Man Who Cried I Am (1967), are mainly about the black experience in white America. The Man Who Cried I Am, a fictionalized account of the life and death of African-American writer Richard Wright, introduced the King Alfred Plan – a fictional CIA-led scheme supporting an international effort to eliminate people of African descent. This "plan" has since been cited as fact by some members of the Black community and conspiracy theorists. Sons of Darkness, Sons of Light: A Novel of Some Probability (1969) imagines a race war in the United States. The novel begins as a thriller with aspects of detective fiction and spy fiction, before transitioning to apocalyptic fiction at the point when the characters' revolt begins.

In the early 1980s, Williams and the composer and flautist Leslie Burrs, with the agreement of Mercer Ellington, began collaborating on the completion of Queenie Pie, an opera by Duke Ellington that had been left unfinished at Ellington's death. The project fell through, and the opera was eventually completed by other hands.

In 2003, Williams performed a spoken-word piece on Transform, an album by rock band Powerman 5000. At the time, his son Adam Williams was the band's guitarist.

Personal life
Williams married Lori Isaac in 1965 and moved in 1975 from Manhattan to Teaneck, New Jersey, as it was a place that "would not be inhospitable to a mixed marriage".

Dear Chester, Dear John, a collection of personal letters between Williams and Chester Himes, who had met in 1961 and maintained a lifelong friendship, was published in 2008.

Honorable recognitions
In 1970, Williams received the Syracuse University Centennial Medal for Outstanding Achievement, in 1983 his novel !Click Song won the American Book Award, and in 1998, his book of poetry Safari West also won the American Book Award. On October 16, 2011, he received a Lifetime Achievement award from the American Book Awards.

Death
Williams died on July 3, 2015, in Paramus, New Jersey, aged 89. He had Alzheimer's disease.

Legacy
Williams' personal papers, including correspondence and photographs, are held at Rare Books, Special Collections, and Preservation, River Campus Libraries at the University of Rochester.  There is also a collection of Williams' papers at the Special Collections Research Center at Syracuse University.

Selected bibliography

Novels
 The Angry Ones,  Norton, 1960, 9780393314649; 
 Night Song, Farrar, Straus and Cudahy, 1961; 
 Sissie, Farrar, Straus and Cudahy, 1963; Chatham Bookseller, 1975, 
 The Man Who Cried I Am, Little, Brown, 1967;  
 Sons of Darkness, Sons of Light, Little, Brown, 1969; Eyre & Spottiswoode, 1970, 
 Captain Blackman, Coffee House Press, 1972,  
 Mothersill and the Foxes, Doubleday, 1975, 
 The Junior Bachelor Society, Doubleday, 1976, 
 !Click Song, 1982 ; 
 The Berhama Account, New Horizon Press Publishers, 1985, 
 Jacob's Ladder, New York: Thunder's Mouth Press, 1987; 1989, 
 Clifford's Blues, Coffee House Press, 1999, ;

Non-fiction
 
 This Is My Country Too (New American Library, 1965)
 The King God Didn't Save: Reflections on the Life and Death of Martin Luther King, Jr. (1970)
 The Most Native of Sons: A Biography of Richard Wright (1970)
 Flashbacks: A Twenty-Year Diary of Article Writing (1973)
 If I Stop I'll Die: The Comedy and Tragedy of Richard Pryor (Thunder's Mouth Press, 1991)

Poetry
 Safari West: Poems (Hochelaga Press, 1998)

Letters
 Dear Chester, Dear John: Letters between Chester Himes and John A. Williams (compiled and edited with LoriWilliams), Wayne State University Press, 2008,

References

Further reading

External links
  Online Exhibit.

  Writers Page.
 "John A. Williams '…arguably the finest African-American novelist of his generation'". African American Literature Book Club.
 John A. Williams papers, D.293, Rare Books, Special Collections, and Preservation, River Campus Libraries, University of Rochester

1925 births
2015 deaths
20th-century African-American people
21st-century African-American people
African-American novelists
American Book Award winners
American writers
People from Teaneck, New Jersey
Syracuse University alumni
United States Navy personnel of World War II
Writers from Jackson, Mississippi